Çıralı is an agricultural village in southwest Turkey, in the Kemer district of Antalya Province. It is walking distance from the ancient ruins of Olympos and Chimaera permanent gas vents, located in the ancient Lycia region of Anatolia.

Çıralı is a very small rural village located just over an hour's drive southwest from Antalya. It has a 3.5 km secluded beach. The ancient ruins of Olympos are located at the far end of its coast. A short hike up the hill is required to reach the flames of the Chimaera.

References

External links

 
 Çıralı Information and Guide.
 Çıralı Information
 Çıralı Online
 REPUBLIC OF TURKEY MINISTRY OF CULTURE AND TOURISM - Antalya - Beydaglari Shore National Park

Turkish Riviera
Villages in Kemer District